Olympic Stadium is the name usually given to the main stadium of an Olympic Games (and that article includes a list of Olympic Stadia).

Olympic Stadium may specifically refer to:

Stadia called "Olympic Stadium" used for Olympic Games

 Olympic Stadium (Amsterdam), Netherlands
 Olympisch Stadion (Antwerp), Belgium
 Olympic Stadium (Athens), Greece
 Centennial Olympic Stadium, Atlanta, United States
 Olympiastadion (Berlin), Germany
 Stadio olimpico del ghiaccio, Cortina d'Ampezzo, Italy
 Olympic Stadium (Grenoble), France
 Helsinki Olympic Stadium, Finland
 Olimpiyskiy National Sports Complex (also known as Olympic Stadium), Kyiv, Ukraine
 London Stadium (formerly and also known as Olympic Stadium), London, England
 Estadio Olímpico Universitario, Mexico City, Mexico
 Olympic Stadium (Montreal), Canada
 Olympic Stadium (Moscow), Russia
 Olympiastadion (Munich), Germany
 Nagano Olympic Stadium, Japan
 Stade Olympique Yves-du-Manoir, Paris, France
 Estádio Olímpico Nilton Santos (formerly Estádio Olímpico João Havelange), Rio de Janeiro, Brazil 
 Stadio Olimpico, Rome, Italy
 Seoul Olympic Stadium, South Korea
 Fisht Olympic Stadium, Sochi, Russia 
 Stockholm Olympic Stadium, Sweden
 Stadio Olimpico Grande Torino, Turin, Italy

Other stadia called "Olympic Stadium"
 Saparmurat Turkmenbashy Olympic Stadium, Ashgabat, Turkmenistan
 Baku Olympic Stadium, Azerbaijan
 Estadio Olímpico Benito Juárez, Ciudad Juárez, Mexico
 RSC Olimpiyskiy, Donetsk, Ukraine
 Guangdong Olympic Stadium, Guangzhou, China
 Olympic Stadium (Hoquiam), Washington (state), US
 Atatürk Olympic Stadium, Istanbul, Turkey
 Stade Olympique de la Pontaise, Lausanne, Switzerland
 Olympic Park Stadium (Melbourne), Australia
 Oran Olympic Stadium - Miloud Hadefi, Algeria
 Phnom Penh Olympic Stadium, Cambodia
 Estádio Olímpico Monumental, Porto Alegre, Brazil
 Estadio Olímpico Atahualpa, Quito, Ecuador
 San Marino Stadium, or Stadio Olimpico di Serravalle, San Marino
 Olympic Stadium (Wrocław), Poland

See also
Olympic Park (disambiguation)